Nigma linsdalei is a species of mesh web weaver in the spider family Dictynidae. It is found in the United States.

References

Dictynidae
Articles created by Qbugbot
Spiders described in 1958